Denness is a surname. Notable people with the surname include:

Anthony Denness (1936–2008), English cricketer
Archer Denness (1914–1997), Australian Army officer
Mary Denness  (1927–2017), British safety campaigner
Mike Denness (1940–2013), Scottish cricketer